Laura Maria Herz  is a Professor of Physics at the University of Oxford. She works on femtosecond spectroscopy for the analysis of semiconductor materials.

Early life and education 
Herz studied physics at the University of Bonn and graduated in 1999, first of her class. She worked for two years as an exchange student at University of New South Wales. She joined the University of Cambridge for her doctoral studies, earning a PhD in 2002. Here she worked on exciton and polaron dynamics in organic semiconductors.

Research and career 
After her PhD, Herz was appointed a postdoctoral research fellow at St John's College, Cambridge, in 2001. She was awarded an Engineering and Physical Sciences Research Council (EPSRC) Advanced Research Fellowship in 2006. Herz became a Professor in 2010.

Herz is an expert in perovskite semiconductors. She has researched the origins of the high charge-carrier mobilities in perovskite materials. She demonstrated that their high efficiency in solar cells was due to long charge-carrier diffusion lengths and non-Langevin recombination. She identified that perovskite light emission is broad and can be used in Ultrafast lasers. She recognised that the origin of this broadening is Fröhlich coupling to longitudinal optical phonons.

Herz is also interested in self-assembly and nanoscale effects. She works on Biomimetics light harvesting structures made of porphyrin nanorings to explore delocalised excited states.  She is the co-director of the Imperial College London Centre for Doctoral Training in Plastic Electronic Materials.

She appeared on the BBC Radio 4 show In Our Time in 2015. She will join University of Bayreuth in 2018 to deliver a series of lectures.

Awards and honours 

Her awards and honours include:
 2018 Institute of Physics Nevill Mott Medal and Prize
 2018 Oxford University Student Union Outstanding Graduate Supervisor
 2018 Alexander von Humboldt Foundation Friedrich-Wilhelm-Bessel Award

References

External links 
 

Year of birth missing (living people)
Living people
21st-century German physicists
21st-century German women scientists
Academics of the University of Oxford
Alumni of the University of Cambridge
German women physicists
University of Bonn alumni
Fellows of University College, Oxford